Claiborne Holmes Kinnard Jr. (October 28, 1912– September 18, 1966) was a pilot from Franklin, Tennessee, who in World War II became a flying ace in the United States Army Air Force with the rank of Colonel. He is officially credited with the destruction of 8 enemy aircraft in aerial combat and another 17 on the ground while strafing heavily defended enemy airfields.

Early  and personal life
He was born and raised in Franklin, Tennessee in the historic Claiborne Kinnard House on a farm owned by his father, Claiborne Kinnard Sr. The family farm was located at the corner of Lewisburg Pike and Carnton Lane (now the Heath Place subdivision). The property has historical significance as being the site of the eastern flank of the Civil War Battle of Franklin in 1864. Kinnard's farm was the encampment site of Gen. John Bell Hood's army in 1864. The Kinnard family built a large swimming pool on the property, a business venture  known as "Willow Plunge" which was very popular and remained in business from 1924 to 1967. Kinnard managed the swimming pool and its associated nine-hole golf course in his youth and helped run other family businesses. Kinnard attended Vanderbilt University and graduated with a degree in civil engineering.

He became a skilled golfer and competed in state and regional tournaments. Kinnard married Ruth McDowell of Montgomery, Alabama, whom he met during a tour of duty at Maxwell Field. They had three children, Judith, John and Claiborne.

Military career
He joined the U.S. Army Air Corps as an aviation cadet in 1938 and was commissioned a second lieutenant in 1939. He trained at Randolph Field and had experience in flying every type of American fighter plane available at that time. He served as instructor pilot at Randolph Field and later at airfields in  Louisiana, Alabama and Georgia, from September 1940 to May 1943.

World War II

Deployed to England during WWII, Kinnard became commander of the 360th Fighter Squadron of the 356th Fighter Group in May 1943. He was commander of the 354th Fighter Squadron of the 355th Fighter Group from November 1943 to June 1944. On March 29, 1944, Kinnard shot down a Focke-Wulf Fw 190 near Braunschweig, Germany, his first aerial victory. He destroyed 4 more aircraft on the ground while leading the 354th FS on a strafing mission which in total destroyed 44 German aircraft. On the April 5th, the 355th FG set a record, that was to stand until September with Kinnard becoming the first Eighth Air Force pilot to score his fifth total air and ground kill in one day. The 355th FG received a Distinguished Unit Citation for the mission. Kinnard served with Headquarters 355th Fighter Group from July to September 1944.

Kinnard continued his leadership as one of the top tacticians in the Eighth Air Force for strafing attacks. Largely due to him, the 354th FS would emerge as the top squadron for enemy aircraft destroyed on the ground. He became the 355th FG's seventh flying ace on July 7, 1944, when he shot down three German fighters including 2 Messerschmitt Me 410s and a Messerschmitt Bf-109 while breaking up a German fighter attack on B-24 Liberators near Merseburg, Germany, for which he received the Distinguished Service Cross. Kinnard scored his last two aerial victories near Prague, Czechoslovakia, when he shot down two Bf 109's on April 20, 1945.

Writing about Kinnard, author and flying ace Norman Fortier said, "The was no question in anyone's mind that he was in charge". He was with the 4th Fighter Group from September to December 1944 and commander from November to December before returning to the 355th Fighter Group.

Kinnard was credited with destroying 8 enemy aircraft in aerial combat plus 1 damaged, and he destroyed 17 more on the ground while strafing enemy airfields. He flew an aircraft bearing the legend "Man 'O War". All of Kinnard's fighters – a P-47D, two P-51Bs and five P-51Ds – bore this name.

Later life
After the war, Kinnard returned to Tennessee to live on his family farm. He left active duty in December 1945, and served in the U.S. Air Force Reserve before transferring to the Tennessee Air National Guard in 1953. With partner Howard Johnson, he owned the Superlock Block Company in Franklin. Other business interests were Breeko Block and Brick Company and Span Deck, a machine company. With his father, he co-managed the Willow Plunge Pool and recreation area that occupied a portion of the farm. Kinnard purchased an airplane and built an airstrip on the property in 1947, and for a couple of years, offered plane rides to Willow Plunge patrons. Kinnard died in 1966 from a brain tumor.

Aerial victory credits

SOURCES: Air Force Historical Study 85: USAF Credits for the Destruction of Enemy Aircraft, World War II

Awards and decorations
His awards include:

See also
Claiborne Kinnard House
Willow Plunge

Notes

References

External links

1912 births
1966 deaths
Recipients of the Distinguished Service Cross (United States)
Recipients of the Silver Star
Recipients of the Distinguished Flying Cross (United States)
Recipients of the Air Medal
Recipients of the Croix de Guerre 1939–1945 (France)
American World War II flying aces
Deaths from brain tumor
People from Franklin, Tennessee
Vanderbilt University alumni
United States Army Air Forces pilots of World War II